Sharon Christman is an American soprano and professor.

She serves currently as director of the Vocal Division of the Benjamin T. Rome School of Music, Catholic University of America, in Washington, DC.

References

Year of birth missing (living people)
Living people
American operatic sopranos
Benjamin T. Rome School of Music, Drama, and Art faculty
20th-century American women opera singers
21st-century American women opera singers
American women academics